A total lunar eclipse will take place on March 13, 2044.

Visibility

Related lunar eclipses

Lunar year series

Metonic cycles (19 years)

Tritos series

Half-Saros cycle
A lunar eclipse will be preceded and followed by solar eclipses by 9 years and 5.5 days (a half saros). This lunar eclipse is related to two annular solar eclipses of Solar Saros 140.

See also
List of lunar eclipses and List of 21st-century lunar eclipses

References

External links

2044-03
2044-03
2044 in science